The 2020 New York State Senate elections were held on November 3, 2020, to elect representatives from all 63 State Senate districts across the U.S. state of New York. Primary elections were held on June 23, 2020.

Prior to the 2020 elections, Democrats held 40 seats in the State Senate, while Republicans held 20 seats and three other seats were vacant. In 2018, Democrats won their greatest share of New York State Senate seats since 1912.

In the 2020 elections, Democrats won 43 State Senate seats. Senate Democrats increased their supermajority by three seats, flipping five seats from Republican to Democrat while Republicans flipped two seats from Democrat to Republican.

Background 

By 2018, the State Senate was the last Republican-controlled body in the New York government. In the 2018 elections, Democrats gained eight Senate seats, taking control of the chamber from the Republicans. Previously, Republicans had controlled the Senate for all but three years since World War II, and the Democrats' largest share of New York State Senate seats since 1912. At the beginning of the 2019-2020 legislative session, the Senate Democratic Conference held 39 of the chamber's 63 seats. In July 2019, Simcha Felder — who had caucused with the Republicans during their time in the majority — was accepted into the Senate Democratic Conference, giving the Conference a total of 40 members.

During the 2019-2020 session, Republican Bob Antonacci resigned his seat to become a trial court judge; also, eight other members of the Senate Republican Conference announced that they would not seek re-election in 2020. In June, one of those eight Senate Republicans, Senate Minority Leader John J. Flanagan, announced that he would resign from the Senate to take another position. On July 20, 2020, Republican Sen. Chris Jacobs stepped down after being elected to the United States House of Representatives.

Before the 2020 elections, Democrats held 40 seats in the State Senate. Republicans held 20 seats, and three other seats were vacant.

Predictions

Results 
Following the 2020 elections, the New York State Board of Elections noted that county boards of elections "received a historically high number of absentee ballots for the November 3rd 2020 General Election due to the coronavirus pandemic", and added that "unofficial election night results do not include the results of absentee ballot voting". On Election Day, preliminary results showed Republicans leading in most competitive State Senate races. However, absentee ballots trended in favor of the Democrats.

On November 23, 2020, Senate Majority Leader Andrea Stewart-Cousins asserted that Senate Democrats would enter 2021 with "a supermajority of at least 42 members", giving the party an "unprecedented share" of power in the state Legislature. According to Politico, "the numbers mean that Democratic legislators now have the two-thirds needed in each house to override any vetoes from Gov. Andrew Cuomo without relying on Republican support".

The results of the 2020 Senate elections were certified on December 3, 2020. Democrats won a total of 43 seats, while Republicans won 20. Republican Alexis Weik defeated Democratic incumbent Monica Martinez in the 3rd district, and Republican Mike Martucci defeated Democratic incumbent Jen Metzger in the 42nd district. Democrats Michelle Hinchey, John Mannion, Samra Brouk, Jeremy Cooney, and Sean Ryan won open seats that had previously been held by Republicans.

By district 
BOLD represents a flip and ITALICS represent a new Senator of the same party.

Close races
Districts where the margin of victory was under 10%:

Detailed results

District 1

Democratic primary

General election

District 2

District 3

District 4

District 5

District 6

Libertarian primary

General election

District 7

District 8

District 9

District 10

District 11

District 12

Democratic primary

General election

District 13

Democratic primary

General election

District 14

District 15

District 16

District 17

District 18

Democratic primary

General election

District 19

Democratic primary

General election

District 20

District 21

District 22

District 23

Democratic primary

General election

District 24

District 25

Democratic primary

General election

District 26

District 27

Democratic primary

General election

District 28

District 29

District 30

District 31

Democratic primary

General election

District 32

Democratic primary

General election

District 33

District 34

Democratic primary

General election

District 35

District 36

District 37

District 38

Democratic primary

Republican primary

General election

District 39

District 40

District 41

District 42

District 43

District 44

District 45

District 46

District 47

District 48

District 49

Democratic primary

General election

District 50

District 51

District 52

District 53

District 54

District 55

District 56

Democratic primary

General election

District 57

District 58

District 59

District 60

District 61

Democratic primary

Independence primary

General election

District 62

District 63

See also
 2020 New York state elections

Notes

References

External links
 
 
  (State affiliate of the U.S. League of Women Voters)
 

Senate
New York State Senate elections
New York Senate